Kamalapura, sometimes written Kamalapur and Kamalapuram) is a panchayat town in Bellary district in Karnataka. It is located near the town of Hosapete. It lies within the ruins of the old city of Vijayanagara, just outside the original 'Royal Centre'. It is now mainly an agricultural town. The main agricultural products of this village are rice, banana and sugar cane. It contains some of the ruins of the old city, and an archaeological museum. A large tank, Kamalapura Kere, lies to the south of the village.

The village is situated a short distance south of the Hampi temple complex and Tungabhadra River. The town is flanked by three reservoirs and a canal system. It is close to Kannada University.

A ruined temple stands within a small fort in the center of the village.

The Archeological Museum in the village displays many items from the ruins, and for the surrounding region. These include many images of Durga, and also the Lakshmi statue associated with the monolithic Narasimha of Vijayanagara. There is a scale model of the entire city centre of Vijayanagara within a courtyard of the museum. Images and details of early and prehistoric man in the region can also be seen in it.

External links

Municipality website

Cities and towns in Bellary district